Three cities made the shortlist with their bids to host the 2010 Winter Olympics and Paralympics (also known as XXI Olympic Winter Games and the X Paralympic Winter Games), which were awarded to Vancouver, British Columbia, Canada, on July 2, 2003. The other shortlisted cities were Pyeongchang and Salzburg. Although Bern was originally shortlisted along with Vancouver, Pyeongchang and Salzburg, a referendum held in September 2002 revealed that a majority of the citizens of Bern did not support pursuing the candidacy. There were four other cities vying for the hosting honour, that had been dropped by the International Olympic Committee: Andorra la Vella, Harbin, Jaca and Sarajevo.

Vancouver won the bidding process to host the Olympics by a vote of the International Olympic Committee on July 2, 2003 at the 115th IOC Session held in Prague, Czech Republic.  Earlier in February, Vancouver's residents voted in a referendum accepting the responsibilities of the host city should it win its bid. Sixty-four percent of residents voted in favour of hosting the games. In neighboring Washington state to the south, both the state legislature and Governor Gary Locke passed a resolution in support of Vancouver's bid, and sent it to the IOC.

Bidding process
Eight cities applied to host the games. Those cities were (in the order of drawing the lots):
 Vancouver, British Columbia, Canada
 Sarajevo, Bosnia and Herzegovina
 Jaca, Spain
 Salzburg, Austria
 Pyeongchang, South Korea
 Harbin, People's Republic of China
 Bern, Switzerland
 Andorra la Vella, Andorra

Each city was required to answer a twenty-two question questionnaire.

Evaluation

The IOC Candidature Acceptance Working Group, which evaluated the applications divided their recommendations into eleven areas.

Each cell of the table provides a minimum and a maximum figure obtained by the applicant city on the specific criteria. These figures are to be compared to a benchmark which has been set at 6.

Four cities were named Candidate Cities: Bern, Pyeongchang (which both met the benchmark), Salzburg, and Vancouver (which both exceeded it). They made additional comments with respect to Bern and Pyeongchang. As for Bern, they felt the bid had significant organizational difficulties and the financial plan's feasibility was dependent on a popular referendum. As for Pyeongchang, the resort area of Yongpyong required further development.

In September, a referendum ended Bern's chances of winning.

Each candidate city was required to answer a 199-question questionnaire.
After the withdrawal of Bern, the IOC Evaluation Commission visited the three remaining cities on the following dates:
 Pyeongchang: February 14–17, 2003
 Vancouver: March 2–5, 2003
 Salzburg: March 13–16, 2003

Election

There were two rounds of voting at the convention that decided which city would host the games.  In the first round Pyeongchang received 51 votes, while Vancouver received 40 and  Salzburg with only 26 votes, thus eliminating them in the first round. In the second and final round of voting, Vancouver received 56 votes to Pyeongchang's 53, which proved to be the difference in margin of victory and the closest vote for an Olympic city host since Sydney, Australia beat Beijing, China by 2 votes for the 2000 Summer Olympics.

Across Canada, and especially in the province of British Columbia, celebrations broke out amidst the announcement made by IOC President Jacques Rogge, as evidenced on the CBC, by the network's chief correspondent, Peter Mansbridge. While Vancouver and the rest of British Columbia celebrated, the mood was bittersweet in Toronto which had aspirations to host the 2012 Summer Olympics which were awarded to London. Canada's largest city has already lost bids to host the 1996 and 2008 Summer Olympics to Atlanta and Beijing. The announcement came the day after Canada celebrated its 136th anniversary, with Canada Day. With ice hockey being their pastime, some of the people at GM Place said that winning an Olympic Games is far greater than winning a Stanley Cup when they heard the announcement. Wayne Gretzky made this evident in Prague, as he served as an ambassador and contributor to the games and was part of the presentation team.

Bidding cities

Candidate cities

Notes
 Whistler, British Columbia, where some of the Vancouver 2010 events were held, was previously asked to host the 1976 Winter Olympics after Denver, Colorado, the original host city, declined to host the Games due to cost concerns.  Whistler, which had previously placed a bid on the 1976 Games, declined the opportunity.  The 1976 Games were eventually passed on to Innsbruck, Austria.

See also
 Smiggin Holes 2010 Winter Olympic bid

References

External links

Candidature files
 Vancouver Volume 1 
 Vancouver Volume 2 
 Vancouver Volume 3 
 Sazlzburg Volume 1
 Sazlzburg Volume 2
 Sazlzburg Volume 3

Mini bid books
 Andorra 2010
 Berne 2010
 Harbin 2010
 Jaca 2010
 PyeongChang 2010
 Salzburg 2010
 Sarajevo 2010
 Vancouver 2010

Bids
 
Events in Prague
2003 in the Czech Republic
2000s in Prague
July 2003 events in Europe